Vercruysse is a Flemish surname. Notable people with the surname include:

André Vercruysse, Belgian cyclist
Jan Vercruysse (1948–2018), Belgian artist, sculptor, and photographer
Philippe Vercruysse (born 1962), French footballer

Surnames of Belgian origin